Ceduovirus (synonyms c2-like viruses, c2-like phages, C2likevirus) is a genus of viruses in the family Siphoviridae, unassigned to a sub-family. Bacteria serve as the natural host, with transmission achieved through passive diffusion. There are 34 species in this genus.

Taxonomy
The following species are recognized:

 Lactococcus virus 05802
 Lactococcus virus 20R03M
 Lactococcus virus 37203
 Lactococcus virus 50102
 Lactococcus virus 50504
 Lactococcus virus 5171F
 Lactococcus virus 62402
 Lactococcus virus 62403
 Lactococcus virus 62606
 Lactococcus virus bIBB14
 Lactococcus virus bIBBA3
 Lactococcus virus bIBBAm4
 Lactococcus virus bIBBE1
 Lactococcus virus bIBBL12
 Lactococcus virus bIBBp6-4
 Lactococcus virus bIL67
 Lactococcus virus blBB94p4
 Lactococcus virus c2
 Lactococcus virus CHPC116
 Lactococcus virus CHPC122
 Lactococcus virus CHPC966
 Lactococcus virus CHPC967
 Lactococcus virus CHPC972
 Lactococcus virus CHPC1020
 Lactococcus virus CHPC1170
 Lactococcus virus CHPC1182
 Lactococcus virus CHPC1183
 Lactococcus virus CHPC1242
 Lactococcus virus D4410
 Lactococcus virus D4412
 Lactococcus virus LacS15
 Lactococcus virus M5938
 Lactococcus virus PCB1
 Lactococcus virus PCS1

Structure
Ceduoviruses are nonenveloped, with a head and tail. The prolate head is about 56 nm long and 41 nm wide and has a collar. The tail is cross-banded, is about 86-111 nm long, 8 nm wide, and has short tail fibers. Genomes are linear, around 22kb in length.

Genome
Some species have been fully sequenced. They range between 22k and 23k nucleotides, with 37 to 39 proteins. Complete genomes are available here

Life cycle
Viral replication is cytoplasmic. The virus attaches to the host cell's adhesion receptors using its terminal fibers, and viral exolysin degrades the cell wall enough to eject the viral DNA into the host cytoplasm via long flexible tail ejection system. Replication follows the DNA strand displacement, via replicative transposition model. DNA templated transcription is the method of transcription. Bacteria serve as the natural host. Transmission routes are passive diffusion.

History
According to ICTV's 1996 report, the genus C2likevirus was first accepted under the name c2-like phages, assigned only to family Siphoviridae. The whole family was moved to the newly created order Caudovirales in 1998, and the genus was renamed to c2-like viruses in ICTV's seventh report in 1999. In 2012, the genus was renamed again, this time to C2likevirus. The genus was later renamed to Ceduovirus.

References

External links
 Viralzone: C2likevirus
 ICTV

Siphoviridae
Virus genera